Changes is the 23rd studio album by Australian psychedelic rock band King Gizzard & the Lizard Wizard, released on 28 October 2022. It is the third album the band released during October of 2022 and fifth and final album to be released overall during the year.

Background and recording
On 18 June 2022, the band posted a tweet promising three more albums by the end of 2022. More details came on 12 July, when it was reported that the last album was "something Gizzard has been working on since 2017 - the longest amount of time the band has ever spent on a single record." Mackenzie stated that "There isn’t a jamming vibe on it. It’s super considered, for a Gizz record. Every overdub and every part is important", and described the record as "more of a song cycle".

The album was first conceived in 2017. That same year, the band released five studio albums. Changes was supposed to be the final one, however the band didn't think the album was finished, and instead released Gumboot Soup. The eventual release of the album contains "Exploding Suns" as it was recorded back in 2017.

As stated by band member Stu Mackenzie: "Every song is built around this one chord progression – every track is like a variation on a theme." The band had been "tinkering with" Changes since then, calling the album "not necessarily our most complex record, but every little piece and each sound you hear has been thought about a lot." 

The overall sound of the album was described as "soaked in the warm sonics of 70s R’n’B and guided by simple chord-changes that contain multitudes". It was also noted that the first letter of each song title on Changes spells out the album’s title.

Changes was originally going to be one long song. That became the album's 13-minute opening track "Change", which was described as an "odyssey touching on kaleidoscopic '60s pop, color-splattered prog-rock fireworks, and floaty, keyboard-driven retro R&B". Mackenzie described the following songs as building out of the first track: "'Hate Dancin'' is built out of one of the chord progressions from 'Change'. And then 'Astroturf' is built out of one of the chord progressions in "Change" as well. And so is 'Short Change', the last song. Every song on the album is built out of a section of 'Change.'

Release
On 7 September, it was revealed that copies of the album will be available at the band's show at the Orpheum in New Orleans, on 27 October, a day ahead of the album's release date.

A music video for the first single "Hate Dancin'", directed by John Angus Stuart, was released on 17 October.

The album was released on 28 October.

Critical reception

In the review for AllMusic, Tim Sendra described that albums as being, "weird and familiar at once, like exploring the moon from the safety of your own couch." and claimed that, "King Gizzard are never less than compelling, and even when their concepts are modest, they deliver a final product that's psychedelic pop/rock/funk/soul/prog/what have you at its very best." Concluding the review for Far Out Magazine, Aimee Ferrier compared it the band's previous work; "Changes is no Nonagon Infinity, Infest the Rats' Nest or Flying Microtonal Banana, but these incredible albums naturally take some beating. The band’s 23rd effort feels concise and lovingly made, delivering some of the band’s most tender and mature moments yet." Louder Than War's Wayne Carey also drew comparisons to other releases in the band's oeuvre, claiming that, "King Gizz continue to surprise with each release. Three albums in a month including Ice, Death, Planets, Lungs, Mushrooms and Lava, Laminated Denim and now Changes. I could only review one and I think this album speaks for them all. An absolute treasure on the music scene and not a bad release yet as far as I’m concerned. A stunning collection of work that continues to surprise."

Reviewing the album for Uncut, Maclay Heriot stated that, "Changes underscores its makers' commitment to evolution".

Track listing
Vinyl releases have tracks 1–2 on side A, and 3–7 on side B.

Personnel
King Gizzard & the Lizard Wizard 
 Stu Mackenzie – vocals, Wurlitzer, synthesiser (all tracks), drums, vibraphone (track 1), guitar (tracks 1, 2, 4, 7), bass guitar (tracks 1–4, 6, 7), Mellotron, keyboards (tracks 1, 3, 7), organ (tracks 1–3), flute (track 3), percussion (track 5)
 Michael Cavanagh – drums (all tracks)
 Ambrose Kenny-Smith – percussion (all tracks), vocals (tracks 1–6), keyboards (tracks 1, 3, 4), saxophone (track 3)
 Cook Craig – synthesiser (tracks 1, 5, 6), keyboard, vocals, guitar (track 1), bass guitar (track 6)
 Joey Walker – synthesiser (tracks 1–3, 5), guitar (tracks 1, 3), vocals (track 1)

Production
 Stu Mackenzie – recording (tracks 1–5, 7), mixing, production
 Nico Wilson – recording (track 1)
 Sam Joseph − recording (track 6)
 Joe Carra – mastering
 Jason Galea – photography, design

Charts

References

2022 albums
King Gizzard & the Lizard Wizard albums
Song cycles